Baby, It's Cold Outside is a Christmas album by Holly Cole. It was released in Canada in 2001 on Alert Records.

Track listing

 "Christmas Time Is Here" (Guaraldi, Mendelson) – 3:01
 "Baby, It's Cold Outside" (Loesser) – 4:07
 "The Christmas Song" (Torme, Wells) – 5:07
 "Santa Baby" (Javits, Springer, Springer) – 4:00
 "I'll Be Home for Christmas" (Gannon, Kent, Ram) – 3:08
 "'Zat You Santa Claus" (Fox) – 3:22
 "If We Make It Through December" (Haggard) – 3:42
 "Christmas Is" (Faith, Maxwell) – 2:40
 "Wildwood Carol" (Grant, Rutter) – 2:54
 "Sleigh Ride" (Anderson, Parish) – 2:37
 "What Is This Lovely Fragrance?" (Traditional) – 4:22
 "Never No" (O'Hara) – 2:13
 "What About Me" (Davis) – 1:42

Personnel 

Ryan Aktari – Assistant
Brian Barlow – Percussion, Chimes, Cymbals
Guido Basso – Trumpet, Flugelhorn
W. Tom Berry – Executive Producer
Daniel Blackman – Viola
Rodney Bowes – Package Design
Holly Cole – Arranger, Vocals, Voices, Producer, Shaker
Young Dae Park – Violin
Aaron Davis – Piano, Arranger, Celeste, Conductor, Producer, Orchestral Arrangements
Phil Demetro – Digital Editing
Vern Dorge – Saxophone
David Dunlop – Trumpet
Mark Fewer – Violin
Michael Haas – Engineer, Recording
Fujice Imajishi – Violin
John "Snakehips" Johnson – Saxophone, Wind
Johnny Lee "Jaimoe" Johnson – Flute (Alto), Saxophone, Sax (Soprano), Wind Instruments
Mark Kelso – Drums, Drums (Snare)
Robert F. Kennedy – Clothing/Wardrobe, Make-Up, Hair Stylist, Wardrobe, Clothing Design
Audrey King – Cello
Debbie Kirshner – Violin
George Koller – Bass
Janice Lilndskoog – Harp
Ray Luedeke – Clarinet
Kathy MacLean – Bassoon
Andrew MacNaughtan – Photography
Jayne Maddison – Violin
Gord Myers – Trombone
Pamela Neal – Clothing/Wardrobe, Make-Up, Hair Stylist, Wardrobe, Clothing Design
Roberto Occhipinti – Bass, String Contractor, String Coordinator
Hyung-Sun Paik – Violin
Gary Pattison – French Horn
David Piltch – Bass, Percussion, Arranger
Jasques Poirer – Engineer, Recording
Terry Promane – Trombone
Ed Robertson – Vocals, Voices
Cynthia Steljes – Horn (English), Oboe
Vera Tarnowsky – Violin
Kent Teeple – Viola
Camille Watts – Flute, Piccolo
Julia Wedman – Violin
Jeff Wolpert – Engineer, Mastering, Mixing, Recording
Kirk Worthington – Cello

References

Holly Cole albums
2001 Christmas albums
Christmas albums by Canadian artists
Jazz Christmas albums
Alert Records albums